Outback Revenge (original limited released as Sleeper) is a 2012 Australian action horror film that was written and directed by Dru Brown and produced by Judd Tilyard. It features Bruce Hopkins and Scott "Raven" Levy.

Plot
Brutal killer Adam Resnik (Scott Levy) escapes during a prison transfer and begins a bloody killing spree on his way home to Moonlight Bay, and the target of his desire – the young and vulnerable Kelly (Kym Jackson). Detectives Raynor (Bruce Hopkins) and Molloy (Ty Hungerford) track Resnik as he closes in on Kelly and her friends, racing to catch him before the sun goes down.

Cast

 Scott Levy as Adam Resnik
 Kym Jackson as Kelly
 Bruce Hopkins as Det. Raynor
 Ty Hungerford as Det. Molloy
 Ray Sinclair as Det. Dwayne Miller
 Mick Roughan as Jack Chase
 Greg Bownds as Chase's Friend
 Nathan Corbett as Carnage
 Nicole Payten as Heather 
 Lauren Orrell as Sara
 Adam Fawns as Josh
 Robert Reitano as Toby
 Cory Robinson as Baker
 Chris Hillier as Wace
 Christian McCarty as Ben
 Darko Tuscan as Det. Johnson
 Cameron Ambridge as Harry
 Nicholas G. Cooper as Officer Laffranchi
 Matt Gaffney as Mitchell
 Paul Geoghegan as Fowler
 Russell Ingram as Thomas
 Bridgette Paroissien as Swank
 Deborah Robson as Tammy
 Mick Roughan as Jack Chase
 Nicholas Schodel as Richard
 Ben Siemer as Randal

Release
The film had an original limited release under the title Sleeper, and a later wider release under the title Outback Revenge with an accompanying horror short titled Mr. Bear.

Reception
HorrorNews.net gave Sleeper a favorable review, writing that "Even though Sleeper sounds like films most of us have seen hundreds of times it still finds a way to knock its viewer on their head. The film simply flows and there isn’t really any slow moments, Resnick gets free and proceeds to tear through the town."

28 Days Later Analysis wrote "the story is a violent one, but one of better film elements within Sleeper are the many diverse settings", and also noted the "ending is a little vague, but the many action scenes make up for some of the deficiencies." They scored the film 7 out of 10, concluding "the story is not fleshed enough, a multi-dimensional villain, predictable".

Of its release in Germany, Amboss-Mag reviewed Outback Revenge and noted Scott Levy's showing himself as a superb casting choice for the role of Resnick.  While most of the other cast were not entirely convincing, that point was less important because all they had to do was appear and "bite the dust", and though it barely prevented itself from looking low-budget, it was an entertaining action film.

References

External links
  as archived January 1, 2015
 Sleeper at the Internet Movie Database

2012 films
2012 horror films
Australian action horror films
Australian slasher films
2010s action horror films
2010s slasher films
2010s English-language films